Kipling D. Williams is a Distinguished Professor of Psychology in the Department of Psychological Sciences at Purdue University in West Lafayette, Indiana. He received his Ph.D. in Social Psychology from Ohio State University. He is most noted for his research on ostracism and has developed unique methods to study the processes and consequences.

Williams has conducted research in several areas, including aggression, group processes and close relationships. However, he has specific research topics that include ostracism, social loafing and social compensation, internet research, stealing thunder, which is a specific tactic used to deflate any negative impact of changing a person's testimony, law and psychology.

Williams has a primary interest in social influence. In addition, he has contributed to publications in both the field of psychology and in the field of law, which deal with issues of different realms of social influence. Some of these realms of social influence concern eyewitness memory and testimony, biasing judges’ instructions, and most recently, on influencing jurors to scrutinize confidence inflation in court cases. However, Williams’ interests mostly include group processes and social influence. While some people regard this as simple group research, he regards it as a phenomenon of very basic social influence. He believes that an individual's emotions, subsequent social susceptibility, and motivations are all impacted when that person is ostracized.

Williams believes that “social influence is of great importance to his self-definition and to his interest in social psychology.” Simply put, he believes that “the heart of social psychology is social influence.”

He was an associate editor of both the Personality and Social Psychology Bulletin and Group Dynamics: Theory, Research, and Practice.  He is currently the editor of Social Influence.

Books and chapters in books
Co-editor. The Psychology of Social Conflict and Aggression. NY: Psychology Press, 2011.
Co-editor. The Social Outcast: Ostracism, Social Exclusion, Rejection, and Bullying. NY: Psychology Press, 2005.
Co-editor. Psychology and Law: An Empirical Perspective. NY: Guilford Press, 2005.
Ostracism: The Power of Silence. NY: Guilford Press, 2001.
Ostracism: A Temporal Need-Threat Model. In Zanna, M. (Ed.) Advances in Experimental Social Psychology, 41 (pp. 279–314). NY: Academic press, 2009.
Co-author. Using Virtual Game Environments to Study Group Behavior. In Hollinhshead, A.B. and Poole, M.S. (Eds.) Research Methods for Studying Groups: A Behind-the-Scenes Guide. (pp. 173–198). NY:m Taylor & Francis/Routledge, 2012.
Ostracism. Annual Review of Psychology, 2007, 58, 425–452.

Cyberball

He has a free downloadable program called “Cyberball,” which can be used in research to study issues that surround ostracism. Dr. Williams has contributed to different psychological articles and he has also written several different books related to his psychological interests.

References

21st-century American psychologists
Social psychologists
Living people
Year of birth missing (living people)